

This is a list of all constituencies that were in existence at the 1950, 1951, 1955, 1959, 1964, 1966 and 1970 general elections, showing the winning party and broken down by region and county.

South West (43)

Cornwall (5)

Devon (10)

Somerset (7)

Dorset (4)

Gloucestershire (12)

Wiltshire (5)

South East (including London) (148 to 1955; 151 from 1955)

Oxfordshire (3)

Buckinghamshire (5)

Berkshire (6 then 5)

Hampshire (13 then 14)

Isle of Wight (1)

Surrey (19 then 20)

Sussex (11 then 12)

Kent (19 then 20)

Middlesex (28 then 29) 
With the exception of Spelthorne, which became part of Surrey, all of these constituencies became part of the county of Greater London when it was formed and Middlesex was abolished in 1965.

County of London (43 then 42) 
The county of London was abolished in 1965 and became part of the much larger county of Greater London.

See https://commons.wikimedia.org/wiki/Category:Locator_maps_of_former_parliamentary_constituencies_of_England_1948

East Anglia (55 to 1955; 58 from 1955)

Bedfordshire (4)

Hertfordshire (7 then 8)

Huntingdonshire (1)

Cambridgeshire and Isle of Ely (3) 
The separate administrative counties of Cambridgeshire and Isle of Ely were combined in 1965.

Norfolk (8)

Suffolk (5)

Essex (24 then 26)

East Midlands (42)

Derbyshire (10)

Nottinghamshire (10)

Leicestershire (8)

Lincolnshire and Rutland (9)

Northamptonshire and Soke of Peterborough (5) 
The administrative county of the Soke of Peterborough was combined with Huntingdonshire in 1965 to form Hundingdonshire and Peterborough.

West Midlands (55 to 1955; 57 from 1955)

Shropshire (4)

Staffordshire (17 then 18)

Herefordshire (2)

Worcestershire (7)

Warwickshire (22 then 23)

North West (83 to 1955; 82 from 1955)

Cumberland (4)

Westmorland (1)

Lancashire (64 then 62)

Cheshire (15 then 16)

North East (28)

County Durham (18)

Northumberland (10)

Yorkshire (56 to 1955; 54 from 1955)

York (1)

East Riding (7)

North Riding (7)

West Riding (43 then 41) 



Wales (36)

Anglesey (1)

Caernarfonshire (2)

Denbighshire (2)

Flintshire (2)

Merionethshire (1)

Montgomeryshire (1)

Breconshire and Radnorshire (1)

Cardiganshire (1)

Carmarthenshire (2)

Pembrokeshire (1)

Glamorgan (16)

Monmouthshire (6)

Scotland (71)

Orkney and Shetland (1)

Caithness and Sutherland (1)

Inverness-shire and Ross and Cromarty (3)

Banffshire (1)

Moray and Nairnshire (1)

Aberdeenshire (4)

Angus and Kincardineshire (4)

Argyll (1)

Perthshire and Kinross-shire (2)

Stirlingshire and Clackmannanshire (3)

Fife (4)

Dunbartonshire (2)

Renfrewshire (4)

Ayrshire and Bute (5)

Lanarkshire (22)

West Lothian (1)

Midlothian and Peeblesshire / Midlothian (from 1955) (8)

Dumfriesshire (1)

Kirkcudbrightshire and Wigtownshire (1)

Roxburghshire and Selkirkshire / Roxburghshire, Selkirkshire and Peeblesshire (from 1955) (1)

Berwickshire and East Lothian (1)

Northern Ireland (12)

Antrim (6)

Down (2)

Armagh (1)

Fermanagh and Tyrone (2) 

1The constituency was won by Philip Clarke of Sinn Féin, but he was unseated on petition on the basis that his criminal conviction (for Irish Republican Army activity) made him ineligible. Instead, the seat was awarded to the Ulster Unionist Party (UUP) candidate.

2The seat was originally won by Tom Mitchell of Sinn Féin, but Mitchell was subsequently unseated upon petition, on the grounds that his terrorist convictions made him ineligible to sit in Parliament. The seat was awarded to Charles Beattie of the UUP. However, Beattie in turn was also found ineligible to sit due to holding an office of profit under the crown, triggering a further by-election.

Londonderry (1)

See also 

1955
1950s in the United Kingdom
1960s in the United Kingdom
1970s in the United Kingdom